Keanu (also known as Cat Boys) is a 2016 American buddy action comedy film directed by Peter Atencio and written by Jordan Peele and Alex Rubens. The film stars Peele and Keegan-Michael Key in their first film as lead actors following five seasons of their sketch TV series; it also features Tiffany Haddish, Method Man, Nia Long, Will Forte, and Keanu Reeves. The plot follows two cousins who infiltrate a gang in order to retrieve their stolen kitten.

Filming began in New Orleans in June 2015. The film premiered at the South by Southwest Festival on March 13, 2016 and was theatrically released in North America on April 29, 2016. It received generally positive reviews from critics and grossed $20 million against its $15 million budget.

Plot
Assassins the "Allentown Brothers", enter a Mexican cartel's drug-processing facility and kill everyone, including the boss, King Diaz. They try to take Diaz's kitten Iglesias, but the kitten escapes. Recently dumped Rell finds the kitten on his doorstep and names it Keanu. Two weeks later, Rell and his cousin Clarence come home from seeing a movie to find Rell’s place ransacked and Keanu missing.

Rell's weed dealer Hulka tells them the "17th St. Blips" gang may have raided Rell's looking for his cat. Hulka sends them to a strip club, where they meet Hi-C, a female gangster, and the gang's leader Cheddar, who mistakes them for the Allentown Boys. Cheddar says he will return the kitten if they act as expert advisors for the Blips on a run to sell a new drug called "Holy Shit". After the sale run, they are abducted by the real Allentown Boys.

Rell and Clarence are tied to chairs and the Allentown Boys prepare to torture them. Keanu frees Rell and Clarence, and they grab their guns. As the Allentown boys approach them, Clarence and Rell unload the guns into them. On their way out, searching for Keanu, they run into the Blips and Cheddar forces them to come along to meet with the Mexican drug cartel the next morning.

There, the Blips meet King Diaz's cousin, Bacon Diaz, offering Clarence and Rell, ‘The Allentown Boys.’ When Bacon also demands "Iglesias", Cheddar refuses and a gunfight erupts between the two gangs. Clarence and Rell shoot their way out of the mansion pursuing Bacon, who has Keanu, only for Rell to be shot in the leg and Clarence shot in the hand.

Rell, who never learned to drive, hijacks Bacon's escape car with Bacon and Keanu in the back; Clarence chases them. It ends at Clarence's front yard where Rell crashes, sending Bacon flying through the broken windshield. Bacon gets up and attempts to shoot Rell, but Clarence runs him over. Again, Bacon gets up, but is shot dead by Cheddar and the Blips.

Hi-C reveals herself as an undercover police officer. She forces the Blips to drop their guns and shoots Cheddar. The police arrive. Hi-C promises to testify for leniency and agrees to go on a date with Rell after they get out of jail.

Six months later, Rell and Clarence have three weeks left on their jail sentences. They are respected by the inmates, including the Blips, for killing the Allentown Boys. Hi-C brings Keanu, telling Rell through a visitation phone that Keanu has a rare disease which will cause him to stay a kitten forever.

Cast
 Keegan-Michael Key as Clarence Dresden
 Jordan Peele as Rell Dresden
 Tiffany Haddish as Trina "Hi-C" Parker
 Method Man as Cheddar
 Jason Mitchell as Bud
 Luis Guzmán as Bacon Diaz
 Nia Long as Hannah
 Will Forte as Hulka
 Darrell Britt-Gibson as Trunk
 Jamar Malachi Neighbors as Stitches
 Rob Huebel as Spencer
 Ian Casselberry as King Diaz
 Keanu Reeves as Keanu (voice)
 Anna Faris as herself (uncredited)

Production
The film was officially announced by New Line Cinema in October 2014, with Peter Atencio directing. Many sites reporting on the film had initially believed it to be a parody of the then recently released John Wick, but according to Atencio the two films were developed independently of each other, and the team was initially unaware of Wick until work on Keanu was already underway. Keanu Reeves himself, who starred in Wick, was eventually in touch with the production, leading a dream sequence in the film to be modified with Reeves providing the voice of the titular kitten. Reeves originally turned down the cameo offer but changed his mind after his sister showed him the film's trailers.

In May 2015, Method Man and Will Forte joined the cast, with Darrell Britt-Gibson being added the following month. Filming began on June 1, 2015, in New Orleans, Louisiana, and concluded on July 10. Seven tabby kittens were used for the shoot. They were trained for three weeks by use of treats, meat flavored baby food and laser pointers, and when not on camera, were allowed to be played with by cast and crew during breaks. Treats were also used to train them to allow themselves to be dressed in lightweight costumes without attempting to remove them. All seven were adopted by the end of production, with Haddish adopting one and naming it 'Catatonic'. Since Key is allergic to cats, he had to take a medication in order to interact with them.

Release
A work-in-progress print was screened at the South by Southwest Festival in Austin, Texas on March 13, 2016.

Warner Bros. originally scheduled the film for release on April 22, 2016, but in January 2016 the film was moved back a week to April 29, 2016.

Reception

Box office
In the United States and Canada, Keanu opened alongside Mother's Day and Ratchet & Clank, and was projected to gross $10–14 million from 2,658 theaters in its opening weekend. The film made $3.5 million on its first day, including $560,000 from Thursday night previews. The film went on to gross $9.5 million over the weekend, finishing third at the box office, behind The Jungle Book ($43.7 million) and The Huntsman: Winter's War ($9.6 million). In its second weekend, the film grossed $3.3 million (a drop of 65.2%), finishing 5th, behind Captain America: Civil War ($179.1 million), The Jungle Book ($24.5 million), Mother's Day ($11.1 million) and The Huntsman: Winter's War ($3.9 million).

Critical response
On Rotten Tomatoes, the film holds an approval rating of 78% based on 182 reviews, with an average rating of 6.40/10. The site's critical consensus reads, "Keanus absurd premise and compulsively watchable starring duo add up to an agreeably fast-paced comedy that hits more than enough targets to make up for the misses." On Metacritic, the film has a weighted average score of 63 out of 100, based on 35 critics, indicating "generally favorable reviews". Audiences polled by CinemaScore gave the film an average grade of "B" on an A+ to F scale.

Accolades

Potential sequel
In a March 2017 AMA on Reddit, Jordan Peele stated that "if we do a Keanu 2, I promise you we will do twice as many deaths as there are in John Wick 2."

See also
 Key & Peele
 List of comedy films of the 2010s

References

External links
 
 
 

2016 films
2016 action comedy films
2010s buddy comedy films
American gang films
American action comedy films
American buddy comedy films
Dune Entertainment films
New Line Cinema films
Warner Bros. films
Films shot in New Orleans
Films about cats
Films about Mexican drug cartels
Hood comedy films
Films shot in Louisiana
Films about animals
Films produced by Jordan Peele
Films scored by Steve Jablonsky
Films with screenplays by Jordan Peele
Films set in Los Angeles
African-American comedy films
2010s English-language films
2010s American films
2010s Mexican films